The 1967 Texas Tech Red Raiders football team represented Texas Technological College—now known as Texas Tech University—as a member of the Southwest Conference (SWC) during the 1967 NCAA University Division football season. In their seventh season under head coach J. T. King, the Red Raiders compiled a 6–4 record (5–2 against conference opponents), finished in second place in the SWC, and outscored opponents by a combined total of 217 to 165. The team's statistical leaders included Joe Matulich with 507 passing yards, Mike Leinert with 689 rushing yards, and Larry Gilbert with 491 receiving yards. The team played its home games at Clifford B. & Audrey Jones Stadium.

Schedule

References

Texas Tech
Texas Tech Red Raiders football seasons
Texas Tech Red Raiders football